Arni University is a private university situated near Kathgarh village in Kangra district, Himachal Pradesh, India. 
Arni University was founded by K D Education trust in 2009. Courses being offered at this university include B.Tech., M.Sc., M.Tech., MBA, M.Phil., Ph.D., BHMCT, M.A, etc. Arni University has been established by an Act of Himachal Pradesh Govt and approved by the UGC, vide notification No F-No 8-5/2010 (CPOP-1/PU) dated 3 March 2010.

References

Private universities in India
Universities in Himachal Pradesh
Education in Kangra district
Educational institutions established in 2009
2009 establishments in Himachal Pradesh